Cyclophora mesotoma is a moth in the  family Geometridae. It is found in China (Hainan).

References

Moths described in 1920
Cyclophora (moth)
Moths of Asia